The weightlifting competition at the 1952 Summer Olympics in Helsinki consisted of seven weight classes, all for men only.  The middle-heavyweight division was a newly created weight class, moving the heavyweight class up from 82.5 kg to 90 kg. The events were held at Messuhalli.

Medal summary

Medal table

References

Sources
 

 
1952 Summer Olympics events
1952
1952 in weightlifting